Boyarina Morozova (Боярыня Морозова) is a 2006 choral opera by Rodion Shchedrin based on his own libretto on the story of Boyarina Morozova (d.1675), from the account of archbishop Avvakum and inspired by the painting Boyarina Morozova by Vasily Surikov.

References

Russian-language operas
2006 operas
Operas by Rodion Shchedrin
Operas
Operas set in the 17th century
Operas based on real people
Cultural depictions of Russian women
Cultural depictions of religious leaders
Operas set in Russia